The Golden Gate is a historic Renaissance city gate in Gdańsk, Poland. It is located within the Royal Route, the most prominent part of the historic city center and is one of its most notable tourist attractions.

It was created in 1612–14 in place of a 13th-century gothic gate, the Brama Długouliczna (Long Street Gate). It is located at one end of Ulica Długa (Long Lane), where, together with Brama Wyżynna (Highland Gate) and Wieża Więzienna (Prison Tower), it forms a part of the old city fortifications.

It was designed by architect Abraham van den Blocke and was built by Jan Strakowski. The architectural style of the gate is Dutch mannerism. Next to it is the late-gothic building of the Brotherhood of St. George.

Both sides of the gate have attiques, with figures symbolizing the qualities of the  ideal citizen. They were designed in 1648 by Jeremias Falck ("Polonus"), and reconstructed in 1878 due to the originals being damaged by weathering over time.

From the West side they represent (in Latin): Pax (Peace), Libertas (Freedom), Fortuna (Wealth) and Fama (Fame). From the East (Long Lane) side  they are Concordia (Agreement), Iustitia (Justice), Pietas (Piety) and Prudentia (Prudency). The Latin inscription on the gates reads: Concordia res publicæ parvæ crescunt – discordia magnæ concidunt ("In agreement small republics grow, because of disagreement great republics fall").

The gate was largely destroyed by Soviet shelling in World War II, but was rebuilt in 1957. Although most artifacts of Germanness were eradicated after the city became part of the Polish People's Republic in 1945, an original German inscription on the gate was restored in the 1990s:  ("They shall prosper that love thee. Peace be within thy walls, and prosperity within thy palaces." – Psalm 122)

External links 

17th-century establishments in Poland
1614 establishments in the Polish–Lithuanian Commonwealth
Buildings and structures completed in 1614
Buildings and structures in Gdańsk
Gates in Poland
Mannerist architecture in Poland
Objects of cultural heritage in Poland
Tourist attractions in Gdańsk